Europe, General Delivery or Europe poste restante (German: Europa postlagernd) is a 1918 German silent mystery film directed by Ewald André Dupont and starring Max Landa, Viktor Senger and Lu Synd. It was part of a series of films starring Joe Deebs, a fiction British detective modelled on Sherlock Holmes. It marked Dupont's directorial debut.

The film's sets were designed by the art director Ernst Stern. It was shot at the Babelsberg Studios in Berlin.

Cast
 Max Landa as Detektiv Joe Deebs 
 Viktor Senger as Addison Wilmott
 Lu Synd as Pussy, seine Frau
 Guido Herzfeld as Leon Devries, Kommissar der Kriminalpolizei
 Maria Andersen as Anita Ferres
 Leonhard Haskel as Jan Suiter, Küster
 Lillebil Ibsen as Alice van der Velde, seine Pflegetochter
 Helene Voß as Frau Smits, Zimmervermieterin
 Hugo Werner-Kahle as Gustav Masson, ihr Onkel
 Stefanie Hantzsch 
 Ernst Lübbert
 Martin Lübbert

References

Bibliography
 Bergfelder, Tim & Cargnelli, Christian. Destination London: German-speaking emigrés and British cinema, 1925-1950. Berghahn Books, 2008.

External links

1918 films
Films of the German Empire
German silent feature films
Films directed by E. A. Dupont
German mystery films
1918 mystery films
German black-and-white films
Films shot at Babelsberg Studios
Silent mystery films
1910s German films